Autumn in New York (subtitled Volume One, but there never were any subsequent volumes) is an album by saxophonist Charles Lloyd recorded in 1979 and released on Mike Love's Destiny label.

Reception 

Allmusic's Scott Yanow said: "This little-known effort is better than some of Charles Lloyd's infrequent projects of the 1970s, for he sticks to tenor and interprets eight standards melodically and with taste".

Track listing 
 "Autumn in New York" (Vernon Duke) – 3:05
 "As Time Goes By" (Herman Hupfeld) – 4:20
 "Wait till You See Her" (Richard Rodgers, Lorenz Hart) – 4:20
 "Nancy (with the Laughing Face)" (Jimmy Van Heusen, Phil Silvers) – 5:17
 "Naima" (John Coltrane) – 3:55
 "Stella by Starlight" (Victor Young) – 4:22
 "But Beautiful" (Van Heusen, Johnny Burke) – 4:21
 "Pensativa" (Clare Fischer) –	4:08

Personnel 
Charles Lloyd – tenor saxophone, arranger
Tom Grant – piano
Kevin Brandon – bass guitar
Kim Calkins – percussion
Suzanne Wallach – vocals
String section arranged and conducted by Clare Fischer

References 

Charles Lloyd (jazz musician) albums
1979 albums
Albums arranged by Clare Fischer